Thoracistus arboreus, the Arboreal Seedpod Shieldback is a species of katydid in the family Tettigoniidae. The species is endemic to Clarens, South Africa.

References

Insects described in 1988
Tettigoniidae